Harold Tyler may refer to:

Harold R. Tyler Jr. (1922–2005), United States federal judge
Harold I. Tyler (1901–1967), American businessman and politician from New York

See also
Harry Tyler (disambiguation)
Harrison Tyler (disambiguation)